Chattahoochee Bend State Park is a state park located in Coweta County, Georgia. At 2,910 acres, is one of the state's largest state parks.

History

The state of Georgia first purchased the land for the park in 1999. In 2006, the state approved $7 million for the first phase of park development. Beginning in 2008, the Friends of Chattahoochee Bend organization began hosting work days to aid in the development of the park. The park was opened to the public on July 1, 2011. It was the first new state park to open since Tallulah Gorge State Park in 1993.

Area

The park was named for its location along a bend in the Chattahoochee River. The park includes seven miles of property along the river.

Facilities and activities

As of 2022, the park offers the following facilities and activities for visitors.

 Biking trails (3.2 miles)
 Boat ramp
 Cottages
 Campsites
 Hiking trails (12 miles)
 Paddling

References

State parks of Georgia (U.S. state)
State parks of the Appalachians
Protected areas of Coweta County, Georgia
2011 establishments in Georgia (U.S. state)